Vassouras (lit. 'Brooms') is a municipality located in the Brazilian state of Rio de Janeiro. Its population was 37,083 (2020) and its area is 552 km².

Vassouras is known for its colonial-era coffee farms and significant royal structures of the Brazilian imperial family.

References

Municipalities in Rio de Janeiro (state)